These 115 genera belong to the family Cantharidae, soldier beetles. There are at least 1,300 described species in Cantharidae.

Cantharidae genera

 Absidia Mulsant, 1863 g
 Absidiella Wittmer, 1972 i g
 Afronycha Wittmer, 1949 g
 Ancistronycha Märkel, 1852 i g
 Armidia Mulsant, 1862 g
 Asilis Broun, 1893 g
 Asiopodabrus  g
 Asiosilis Wittmer, 1977 g
 Atalantycha Kazantsev, 2005 i g b
 Athemus Lewis, 1895 g
 Bactrocantharis
 Belotus Gorham, 1881 i g b
 Bisadia Wittmer, 1972 g
 Boveycantharis Wittmer, 1969 g
 Caccodes Sharp, 1885 i c g b
 Cacomorphocerus Schaufuss, 1891 g
 Callosonotatum Pic, 1945 g
 Cantharis Linnaeus, 1758 i b
 Cantharomorphus Fiori, 1914 g
 Chauliognathus Hentz, 1830 i c g b
 Compsonycha
 Cordicantharis Svihla, 1999 g
 Cordylocera Guérin-Ménéville, 1838 g
 Cordylocerellus Wittmer, 1969 g
 Cratosilis Motschulsky, 1860 g
 Cultellunguis McKey-Fender, 1950 i g b
 Curticantharis Zhang, 1989 g
 Cyrtomoptera Motschulsky, 1860 i g b
 Daiphron Gorham, 1881 g
 Dichelotarsus Motschoulsky, 1859 g b
 Discodon Gorham, 1881 i g b
 Ditemnus LeConte, 1861 g b
 Electronycha Kazantsev, 2013 g
 Electrosilis Kazantsev, 2013 g
 Falsomalthinus Pic, 1924 g
 Falsomalthodes Pic, 1924 g
 Falsopodabrus Pic, 1927 g
 Fissocantharis  g
 Frostia Fender, 1951 i g b
 Geigyella Wittmer, 1972 i g
 Guineapolemius Wittmer, 1969 g
 Habronychus (Monohabronychus) g
 Hatchiana Fender, 1966 i g
 Hemipodistra Ganglbauer, 1922 i g
 Heteromastix Boheman, 1858 g
 Hoffeinsensia Kuska & Kania, 2010 g
 Ichthyurus Westwood, 1848 i g
 Islamocantharis Wittmer & Magis, 1978 g
 Kandyosilis Pic, 1929 g
 Laemoglyptus Fairmaire, 1886 g
 Lobetus Kiesenwetter, 1852 g
 Lycocerus Gorham g
 Macrocerus Motschulsky, 1845 g
 Macromalthinus Pic, 1919 g
 Macrosilis Pic, 1911 g
 Malthesis Motschulsky, 1853 g
 Malthinellus Kiesenwetter, 1874 g
 Malthinus Latreille, 1806 i g b
 Malthodes Kiesenwetter, 1852 i g b
 Malthoichthyurus Pic, 1919 g
 Malthomethes
 Maltypus Motschulsky, 1859 g
 Markus Fanti & Pankowski, 2018 g
 Maronius Gorham, 1881 g
 Metacantharis Bourgeois, 1886 g
 Microdaiphron Pic, 1926 g
 Microichthyurus Pic, 1919 g
 Micropodabrus Pic, 1920 g
 Mimoplatycis Kazantsev, 2013 g
 Mimopolemius Pic, 1921 g
 Neogressittia Wittmer, 1969 g
 Neoontelus Wittmer, 1972 g
 Occathemus Svihla, 1999 g
 Oontelus Solier, 1849 g
 Pacificanthia Kazantsev, 2001 i g b
 Pakabsidia Wittmer, 1972 g
 Paracantharis Wittmer, 1969 g
 Paradiscodon Wittmer, 1969 g
 Paramaronius Wittmer, 1963 g
 Peltariosilis Wittmer, 1952 g
 Phytononus
 Plectonotum Gorham, 1891 i g b
 Podabrinus
 Podabrus Westwood, 1838 i g b
 Podistra Motschulsky, 1839 g
 Podosilis Wittmer, 1978 g
 Polemiosilis Pic, 1921 g
 Polemius LeConte, 1851 i g b
 Porostenus Motschulsky, 1853 g
 Prosthaptus
 Prothemus Champion, 1926 g
 Pseudoabsidia Wittmer, 1969 i g
 Pseudopachymesia Pic, 1911 g
 Pseudosilis Pic, 1911 g
 Pygodiscodon Wittmer, 1952 g
 Rambesilis Pic, 1911 g
 Rhagonycha Eschscholtz, 1830 i g b
 Rhaxonycha Motschulsky, 1860 i g b
 Silidiscodon Leng & Mutchler, 1922 g
 Silis Charpentier, 1825 i g b
 Sinometa Wittmer, 1969 g
 Sogdocantharis
 Sphaerarthrum Waterhouse, 1884 g
 Stenothemus Bourgeois, 1907 g
 Sucinocantharis Kuska & Kania, 2010 g
 Sucinorhagonycha Kuska, 1996 g
 Symphyomethes
 Taiwanocantharis  g
 Telephorus
 Themus (Themus) g
 Troglomethes
 Trypherus LeConte, 1851 i g b
 Tylocerus Dalman, 1833 g
 Tytthonyx LeConte, 1851 i g b
 Walteriella Kazantsev, 2001 g
Data sources: i = ITIS, c = Catalogue of Life, g = GBIF, b = Bugguide.net

References